Phaeoramularia is a genus of fungi in the family Mycosphaerellaceae. It was circumscribed in 1960.

Etymology: probably from Greek φαιος -dusky (colour)- & Latin ramus, ramulus &c. -branch.

Species

P. adenocalymmatis
P. alabamensis
P. asclepiadacearum
P. asiatica
P. caesalpiniacearum
P. calotropidicola
P. cylindrica
P. dichanthii-annulati
P. dissiliens
P. erigeronis
P. eupatorii
P. eupatorii-odorati
P. graminicola
P. heterospora
P. hoehnelii
P. imperatae
P. indica
P. isotomae
P. levieri
P. macrospora
P. maculicola
P. microspora
P. moracearum
P. penicillata
P. psidii-guajavae
P. punctiformis
P. rhamnacearum
P. rosigena
P. spiraeae
P. valerianae
P. verbenacearum

References

External links 

 
Mycosphaerellaceae genera
Dothideomycetes genera